Boletus fagacicola is a species of porcini-like fungus native to China, where it grows under trees of the family Fagaceae.

References

fagacicola
Fungi of China
Fungi described in 2016